Chinese Taipei participated in the 1998 Asian Games held in Bangkok, Thailand from December 6, 1998 to December 20, 1998. Athletes from Taiwan succeeded in winning 19 golds, 17 silvers and 41 bronzes, making for a total of 77 medals. Chinese Taipei finished sixth in the medal table.

References

Nations at the 1998 Asian Games
1998
Asian Games